Tinfields rock rat (Aethomys stannarius) is a species of rodent in the family Muridae
found in Cameroon and Nigeria.
Its natural habitats are dry savanna, subtropical or tropical dry shrubland, and subtropical or tropical dry lowland grassland.

References

Aethomys
Rodents of Africa
Mammals described in 1913
Taxa named by Oldfield Thomas
Taxonomy articles created by Polbot